Tanpopo ("The Dandelion") is a Japanese novel by Yasunari Kawabata, written in 1964, but published complete only posthumously in 1972. Kawabata had commenced serializing his final novel in the literary magazine Shincho, but after winning the Nobel Prize for Literature in October 1968 he ceased all publishing activity. 

A French translation with the title Les pissenlits was published in 2012. An English translation with an afterword by Michael Emmerich was published in 2017 by New Directions.

The plot turns on the blindness of the girl Inako (稲子), when making love to the boy Hisano (久野) and the conversations leading to the decision of the girl's mother to protect him from the girl, lest she harm him when she is blind.

References

1972 novels